A Killing in a Small Town, also known as Evidence of Love, is a 1990 American crime drama television film directed by Stephen Gyllenhaal and written by Cynthia Cidre. The film is based on the 1984 non-fiction book Evidence of Love by John Bloom and Jim Atkinson, and stars Barbara Hershey and Brian Dennehy. It premiered on CBS on May 22, 1990. Hershey won the 1990 Primetime Emmy Award for Outstanding Lead Actress - Miniseries or a Movie.

Plot 
Candy Morrison is a well-respected member of her church and community. After teaching a children’s Bible study, she leaves to pick up a bathing suit at her friend, Peggy Blankenship’s home for Peggy’s daughter, Meg. Candy fails to show up for the children’s pageant show later that morning and returns several hours later, claiming she lost track of time.

Later that night, Peggy’s husband, Stan, who is away on a business trip, becomes worried when Peggy fails to answer the phone and asks his neighbors to check on her. When the neighbors enter the Blankenship home, they discover blood in the bathroom and Peggy’s infant daughter crying in her crib. Eventually, they make their way into the utility room, where they find Peggy’s bloodied and mutilated body. It is revealed that Peggy was murdered with an axe, which shocks the entire town.

The police begin questioning various persons of interest, including Stan, who confesses to having had an affair with Candy prior to the murder. When questioned, Candy admits to the affair but says their relationship ended mutually. Detectives notice inconsistencies in Candy’s story and eventually come to believe she committed the murder. After an intense interrogation, Candy and her husband hire attorney Ed Reivers.

As the investigation intensifies, Candy confesses to Ed that she murdered Peggy, but in self-defense, and subsequently turns herself into the police. Desperate to build a defense and to uncover how Candy was able to calmly resume her daily life after the killing, he has Candy undergo hypnosis. During the session, Candy recovers a repressed childhood memory in which she was rushed to the emergency room after an accident, where her mother forced her to be quiet as she was screaming in pain.

As the trial ensues, Ed becomes concerned with Candy’s flat affect and feels that her demeanor will negatively affect the outcome of the case. He has Candy testify on the witness stand, and the events of the murder are shown from her point of view:

Candy arrives at Peggy’s home to ask if Meg can spend the night and go to the movies. Peggy agrees, and the two share a pleasant conversation. Peggy abruptly asks Candy if she is having an affair with Stan, and Candy reluctantly admits to it but assures her their relationship has been over for a long time. Peggy briefly leaves the room and returns with an axe and orders her not to see Stan again. As Candy prepares to leave, she goes to the utility room to get Meg’s swimsuit where Peggy ambushes her wish the axe. The two engage in a violet struggle. Candy manages to overpower Peggy and hits her with the axe repeatedly. She then showers in the bathroom and leaves.

After recounting the events, Ed, in an effort to make Candy express emotion, deliberately produces the axe, causing her to cry and scream hysterically. Candy is found not guilty, which outrages several people in the courtroom. Despite her acquittal, Candy struggles to move on with her life.

Cast
Barbara Hershey as Candy Morrison (based on Candy Montgomery)
Lee Garlington as Peggy Blankenship
Brian Dennehy as Ed Reivers
Richard Gilliland as Ed Morrison
John Terry as Stan Blankenship
Hal Holbrook as Dr. Beardsley

Production 
Portions of the film, including interior and exterior scenes of Candy Morrison's home, were filmed in Plano, Texas.

References

External links 
 

1990 television films
1990 films
1990 crime drama films
1990s English-language films
American films based on actual events
American crime drama films
Carolco Pictures films
CBS network films
Crime films based on actual events
Crime television films
Drama films based on actual events
American drama television films
Films about murder
Films based on non-fiction books
Films directed by Stephen Gyllenhaal
Films scored by Richard Gibbs
Films set in 1980
Films set in Texas
Films shot in Texas
Television films based on actual events
Television films based on books
1990s American films